Yang Young-Ja (born July 6, 1964) is a retired female table tennis player from South Korea.

Table tennis career
She won gold medals in women's doubles at the 1987 ITTF World Championships  and the 1988 Summer Olympics, together with Hyun Jung-Hwa. She is also a two-time women's singles world champion runner-up in 1983 and 1987.

She retired right after the 1988 Summer Olympics, and currently resides in Seoul working as a table tennis coach responsible for the junior team of South Korea.

See also
 List of table tennis players
 List of World Table Tennis Championships medalists

References

1964 births
Living people
South Korean female table tennis players
Table tennis players at the 1988 Summer Olympics
Olympic table tennis players of South Korea
Olympic gold medalists for South Korea
Olympic medalists in table tennis
Asian Games medalists in table tennis
Table tennis players at the 1982 Asian Games
Table tennis players at the 1986 Asian Games
Medalists at the 1988 Summer Olympics
Asian Games gold medalists for South Korea
Asian Games silver medalists for South Korea
Asian Games bronze medalists for South Korea
Medalists at the 1982 Asian Games
Medalists at the 1986 Asian Games
People from Iksan
Sportspeople from North Jeolla Province
20th-century South Korean women